Pachystylus may refer to:
 Pachystylus (beetle), a genus of beetles in the family Curculionidae
 Pachystylus (plant), a genus of plants in the family Rubiaceae
 Pachystylus, a genus of beetles in the family Chrysomelidae, synonym of Pachybrachis
 Pachystylus, a fossil genus of gastropods in the family Cryptaulacidae, synonym of Laevibaculus